Sigurd Olson "Sig" Haugdahl (January 10, 1891  – February 4, 1970) was an IMCA "Big Car" (now sprint car) champion 1927 – 1932 and an early promoter of stock car racing in the United States.

Background
Sig Haugdahl was born on the Tiller farm in Verdal, Nord-Trøndelag, Norway and migrated to the United States in 1910 making his home with an uncle in Albert Lea, Minnesota. He started his racing career in 1912 on an ice motorbike powered by an Indian engine that reached a speed of 70 M.P.H.  He soon switched to racing motorcycles but gave those up to race automobiles in 1912.

Racing career
Haugdahl's U.S. racing career in 1912, when he drove a specially equipped Indian Motorcycle in ice races in Minnesota. He began dirt track racing in 1918. He became the IMCA champion six years in a row, between 1927 and 1932. He built the Wisconsin Special to unseat USAC champion Tommy Milton. The car was named after its 836 cubic inch Wisconsin Airplane 6-cylinder motor, which was directly connected to the rear wheels. The speed would first be exceeded after over ten years. Haugdahl is credited with winning the International Motor Contest Association (IMCA) sprint car national championships in 1927, 1928, 1929, 1930, 1931, and 1932.

World speed record
Haugdahl is reported to have set a world land speed record of 180 miles per hour in his Wisconsin Special car at the Daytona Beach Road Course on April 7, 1922. A world record was not awarded, however, because the run was not timed by the American Automobile Association and as such could not be verified. It is considered by some that the record speed was claimed by IMCA for the promotional benefits that it would offer. If true, this record would have represented a record speed  faster than the official record, set by a car with a quarter less power than the current holder, five years before the official record reached this level.

Daytona Beach Road Course
World land speed record attempts moved from Daytona to the more consistent surface at the Bonneville Salt Flats with Campbell's Blue Bird in 1935. Not wishing to lose the valuable visitor trade, Daytona Beach officials asked local racer Haugdahl to organize and promote an automobile race along the  course. Haugdahl is credited for designing the track. The city posted at $5,000 purse. The ticket-takers arrived at the event to find thousands of fans already at the track. The sandy turns became virtually impassable, and the event was stopped after 75 of 78 laps. The city has not promoted an event since.

Haugdahl talked with another local driver named William France Sr., and they talked the Daytona Beach Elks Club to host another event in 1937. The event was more successful, but still lost money. Haugdahl didn't promote any more events. France used the experience to found NASCAR.

Award
Sig Haugdahl died at 79 years of age in Jacksonville, Florida. Haugdahl was inducted in the National Sprint Car Hall of Fame in 1994.

References

Other sources
Fleischman, Bill and Al Pearce The Unauthorized NASCAR Fan Guide 1998-99 (Visible Ink Press: 1999)  ,

External links
Historic Racing.com
IMCA National Driving Champion 

1891 births
1970 deaths
Land speed record people
NASCAR people
National Sprint Car Hall of Fame inductees
Norwegian racing drivers
Norwegian emigrants to the United States
People from Verdal
People from Albert Lea, Minnesota
Sportspeople from Trøndelag